Eurajoki is a municipality of Finland located in the region of Satakunta in the province of Western Finland.

The municipality is unilingually Finnish.

Economy

Two of Finland's four nuclear reactors are on the island of Olkiluoto in Eurajoki, and a third one is under construction. The two other operating reactors are at the Loviisa Nuclear Power Plant.

Site-preparation for the construction of the Onkalo spent nuclear fuel repository, a deep geological repository for spent nuclear fuel, is going on (as of Q4 2022). The site will be a permanent facility for spent-fuel storage.

Transport
Highway 8 (E8) and the railway between Kokemäki and Rauma run through the municipality.

Politics
Results of the 2011 Finnish parliamentary election in Eurajoki:

Centre Party   33.7%
Social Democratic Party   26.4%
True Finns   19.2%
National Coalition Party   10.9%
Left Alliance   5.2%
Christian Democrats   2.8%
Green League   1.3%

Notable people
Jere Laaksonen, ice hockey player
Ernesti Rikhard Rainesalo, senator

See also
 Eura
 Liinmaa Castle

References

External links

Municipality of Eurajoki – Official website

 
Populated coastal places in Finland
Populated places established in 1869
1869 establishments in the Russian Empire